The Movement for Democracy (MpD) is a Christian democratic and liberal party in Cape Verde. Established in 1990, it was the ruling party from 1991 to 2001 and returned to power in the 2016 parliamentary election. Its members are nicknamed "" (the wind fans) in Portuguese, a reference to the party's logo.

History
The MpD was established on 14 March 1990 by Carlos Veiga after Prime Minister Pedro Pires of the African Party for the Independence of Cape Verde (PAICV, formerly the sole legal party) allowed its creation. The party was publicly launched in May 1990, and its first convention was held in November 1990.

In the January 1991 parliamentary elections, the first multi-party elections in the country's history, the MpD won 56 of the 79 seats in the National Assembly. In the presidential elections the following month, MpD candidate António Mascarenhas Monteiro defeated the incumbent PAICV President Aristides Pereira.

Following the MpD's second convention in January 1993, splits developed within the party, with two groups, List A and List B, emerging. A split in 1994 led to the creation of the Democratic Convergence Party. Despite losing six seats, the party retained its parliamentary majority in the 1995 elections, whilst Monteiro was re-elected unopposed in the presidential elections the following year.

The January 2001 parliamentary elections saw the party lose another 20 seats, as it was defeated by the PAICV. In the February 2001 presidential elections the MpD nominated Veiga, but he was defeated by the PAICV's Pires by just 12 votes in the second round of voting.

In the 2006 parliamentary elections the party lost another seat and was reduced to 29 MPs. Veiga was again defeated by Pires in the presidential elections later in the year.

Despite gaining three seats in the 2011 parliamentary elections, the MpD remained in opposition. However, in the presidential elections in the same year, MpD candidate Jorge Carlos Fonseca defeated the PAICV's Manuel Inocêncio Sousa by 54–46%.

In July 2013 Ulisses Correia e Silva, the mayor of the capital, Praia, became party's new chairman, following Carlos Veiga, who stepped down after five years.

Fonseca was re-elected as president in the 2016 presidential election. The MpD also won a majority in the National Assembly during the 2016 parliamentary elections, ending fifteen years of PAICV majorities in that body and electing its leader Ulisses Correia e Silva as Prime Minister of Cape Verde.

Electoral history

Presidential elections

National Assembly elections

References

External links
Official website

Political parties established in 1990
Centrist parties in Africa
Liberal parties in Africa
Political parties in Cape Verde
1990 establishments in Cape Verde
Christian democratic parties in Africa